Black Belt is a side-scrolling single-player beat 'em up game released for the Master System in 1986. It is a localization of the Japanese Mark III game, based on the manga and anime series Fist of the North Star (known as Hokuto no Ken in Japan). The export version was released without the Hokuto no Ken license, forcing graphic alterations to the game. Black Belt was one of programmer Yuji Naka's early games prior to his involvement in Sonic the Hedgehog.

Plot and gameplay

The player takes control of a martial artist named Riki (Kenshiro in the original release), who sets out to rescue his girlfriend Kyoko (Yuria) from his rival, Wang (Raoh). The game is composed of six left-to-right side-scrolling stages in which Riki faces different types of underlings (depending on the stage), facing the occasional sub-boss at midpoints of certain stages.  Keeping true to the original source material Hokuto no Ken, underlings violently explode upon being punched or kicked. At the end of each stage, Riki must confront the stage's boss, each being susceptible to only one type of attack. The player must exploit their opponent's weakness and use it to finish the boss off.

Release
Black Belt was originally a Hokuto no Ken game in Japan. The character and backgrounds were changed during localization to remove all ties to the property. The game's third boss, which was originally a battle with a much larger opponent, was also changed to a normal boss battle in Black Belt. However, the game mechanics are still the same and even the lesser enemies die by exploding into bits, which caused the game to be banned from sale to those under age 18 in Germany until 2012. A sequel was released for the Mega Drive in Japan, which was released internationally as Last Battle, once again stripped of the Hokuto no Ken license.

In Japan, a remake of Hokuto no Ken featuring 3D polygonal graphics was released for the PlayStation 2 on March 25, 2004 as the 11th entry in Sega's Sega Ages 2500 line, with an emulation of the original version included as a bonus. The original Master System version was digitally re-released in Japan for the Wii via the Virtual Console service on February 26, 2008. The game can also be unlocked for play in the 2018 title Fist of the North Star: Lost Paradise. The western release of Lost Paradise retains the original Japanese release of Hokuto no Ken rather than its western Black Belt counterpart.

Reception
Computer and Video Games reviewed Black Belt in 1989 and gave it an 80% score. They said the "graphics are neat, and there's loads of kicking and punching action to keep you happy." Computer and Video Games reviewed the game again in 1990, giving it an 81% score and calling it "definitely one of the better Sega beat 'em ups" around.

Computer Gaming World called Black Belt a "straight ahead imitator" of Kung Fu, and mocked the Engrish documentation that stated that the player would fight "Black Women" and "Wang".

See also
 List of beat 'em ups

References

External links

1986 video games
Fist of the North Star video games
Master System games
Sega video games
Post-apocalyptic video games
Virtual Console games
Video games developed in Japan